Maria Samoroukova (born 19 December 1971 in Samara, Russia) is a Greek former basketball player who competed in the 2004 Summer Olympics.

References

1971 births
Living people
Greek women's basketball players
Olympic basketball players of Greece
Basketball players at the 2004 Summer Olympics
Greek people of Russian descent